Franco Balmamion (born 11 January 1940), is an Italian former professional road racing cyclist who raced between 1960 and 1972. The highlight of his career was his successive overall wins in the 1962 and 1963 editions of the Giro d'Italia.

Major results 

1960 
10th National Amateur Road Championships

1961 
3rd Giro dell'Emilia

1962 
1st  Overall  Giro d'Italia
2nd Overall Tour de Suisse
1st Milano–Torino
1st Giro dell'Appennino
2nd Maggiora Criterium
3rd Tre Valli Varesine
10th Pernod–Super Prestige

1963 
1st  Overall  Giro d'Italia
1st Meisterschaft von Zürich
3rd Giro del Veneto
6th Giro dell'Appennino
9th Tre Valli Varesine

1964 
2nd GP du Parisien
3rd Giro dell'Appennino
6th Coppa Sabatini
8th Overall  Giro d'Italia
10th Coppa Agostoni

1965 
1st Caen Team Time trial
2nd Circuito Ciclistico di Ciriè
3rd Milan–San Remo
3rd Nice–Genova
3rd Giro del Lazio
5th Overall  Giro d'Italia
7th Tre Valli Varesine

1966 
1st Maggiora Criterium
2nd Overall Cronostaffetta
6th Overall  Giro d'Italia
8th Coppa Sabatini

1967 
1st  National Road Championships
1st Overall Cronostaffetta
1st Stage 1c
1st Maggiora Criterium
1st Piaggiori Criterium
2nd Overall  Giro d'Italia
2nd Giro della Romagna
3rd Overall Tour de France
3rd Bergamo Criterium
4th Coppa Bernocchi
5th Pernod–Super Prestige
6th Giro dell'Appennino
9th Tre Valli Varesine

1968 
1st Overall Cronostaffetta
7th Overall  Giro d'Italia

1969 
1st Maggiora Criterium
1st Ronde des Korrigans

1970 
3rd Giro del Piemonte

1972 
8th Coppa Agostoni

Grand Tours general classification results timeline

References

Further reading

External links

1940 births
Living people
Sportspeople from the Metropolitan City of Turin
Italian male cyclists
Giro d'Italia winners
Cyclists from Piedmont